Bhoogolam Thiriyunnu is a 1974 Indian Malayalam film, directed and produced by Sreekumaran Thampi. The film stars Raghavan, Rani Chandra, Roja Ramani and Vincent in the lead roles. The film featured original songs composed by V. Dakshinamoorthy.

Cast

Raghavan as Sukumaran
Rani Chandra as Vijayamma
Roja Ramani as Mani
Vincent as Jayan
Sukumari as Chandramathi
KPAC Lalitha as Vatsala
Sankaradi as Aanashanku Pilla
T. R. Omana as Gauriyamma
T. S. Muthaiah as Subramanyan Aashaari
Paul Vengola as Marriage broker 
Alummoodan as Prakkattu Kurup
Baby Sumathi as Gopi's Daughter
Bahadoor as Krishnan Kutty
C. K. Aravindakshan as Varghese
C. K. Saraswathi as Elzabeth
Janardanan as Gopi
Kunchan as Aanakkaaran Panikkar
Kuthiravattam Pappu as Vandikkaaran
Master Rajakumaran Thampi as Gopi's Son
Sadhana as Morukaari Paaru
M. G. Soman as Dr. Murali

Soundtrack
The music was composed by V. Dakshinamoorthy and the lyrics were written by Sreekumaran Thampi.

References

External links
 

1974 films
1970s Malayalam-language films
Films directed by Sreekumaran Thampi